Vatovia is a monotypic genus of Ethiopian jumping spiders containing the single species, Vatovia albosignata. It was first described by Lodovico di Caporiacco in 1940, and is found in Ethiopia. Its taxonomic relationships within the family Salticidae are uncertain.

References

Endemic fauna of Ethiopia
Monotypic Salticidae genera
Salticidae
Spiders of Africa